Alvaton may refer to:

Alvaton, Georgia, an unincorporated community
Alvaton, Kentucky, an unincorporated community